Sar Tang Mahi (also Romanized as Sar Tang Māhī) is a village in Mahru Rural District, Zaz va Mahru District, Aligudarz County, Lorestan Province, Iran. At the 2006 census, its population was 38, in 7 families.

References 

Towns and villages in Aligudarz County